This list includes the awards and nominations of actor Marlon Brando.

Major film awards

Academy Awards 

†Brando declined his award for The Godfather to protest Hollywood's portrayal of Native Americans. He did not attend the ceremony, and was represented by Sacheen Littlefeather, who declined the award on his behalf.

British Academy of Film and Television Arts Awards

Golden Globe Awards

Cannes Film Festival

Directors Guild of America Awards

Major national awards

Bambi Awards (Germany)

David di Donatello (Italy)

Jussi Awards (Finland)

Minor film awards

Golden Raspberry Awards

People's Choice Awards

Stinkers Bad Movie Awards

Western Heritage Awards

Television awards

Emmy Awards (Primetime)

Critics' awards

Chicago Film Critics Association

Italian Online Movie Awards

Kansas City Film Critics Circle

Motion Picture Exhibitor Magazine

National Society of Film Critics

New York Film Critics Circle

Online Film & Television Association

Festival awards

San Sebastián International Film Festival

Tokyo International Film Festival

Others

All-Time Rankings

Golden Apple Awards

Hollywood Walk of Fame

See also 

 Marlon Brando filmography

References

Brando, Marlon